The 1920 AAA Championship Car season consisted of 5 races, beginning in Beverly Hills, California on February 28 and concluding in Beverly Hills on November 25. The AAA National Champion and Indianapolis 500 champion was Gaston Chevrolet. The 1920 season has been a source of confusion and misinformation for historians since 1926.

Official schedule and results
"Note: AAA had two different listings for the 1920 season. At the start of the year, 11 races were listed as counting toward the championship, but at the end of the season, AAA determined the championship to be based on the results of five races giving Gaston Chevrolet the championship. These results were considered official by AAA from 1920-26 and 1929-51. The 11-race championship was first recognized in 1926 with Tommy Milton as champion and was considered official for 1927 and from 1952 to 1955, the final year that AAA sanctioned auto racing." (IZOD IndyCar Series 2011 Historical Record Book - p. 77.)

 Starters limited to first four finishers for each preliminary race
  maximum displacement.
 Points allocated on the basis of advertised distance of 250 miles.

Official National Championship standings

† Chevrolet was killed along with Eddie O'Donnell and Lyall Jolls, O'Donnell's mechanic, at the final race in Beverly Hills.

Controversy over official race schedule

The 5 race schedule has been confirmed as the correct and historically accurate schedule for the championship season of 1920. In the race day program for the final race at Beverly Hills was the points distribution for the championship contenders over the previous four races of the season. The championship was confirmed in the weeks leading up to the race by various newspapers around the country printing the four race championship standings leading to the final race. Confusion about the season began in 1926 when, for "comparative reasons", Contest Board member Arthur Means reworked the schedule to include 10 races and changed the champion to Tommy Milton. The earliest that the ten race standing occur are in the 27 October 1927 issue of Motor Age. In 1951 Racing Board member Russ Catlin found these retroactive crib sheets and folded the results into official AAA documentation, continuing the confusion about the 1920 season and early AAA history as a whole.

The added races to the season are as follows:

Notes: In the Beverly Hills Main the starters limited to first four finishers for each preliminary race and in the Fresno Race Eddie O'Donnell started on the pole.

The false championship results table is as follows:

In 1961, Al Bloemker attempted to reconcile the two different accounts for the 1920 season. He surmises that there was an issue with sanctioning fees paid by the Uniontown Speedway and their two races held that year were not included in the final season standings. The printed media of the time is silent about any issue with the Uniontown races not being championship events.  They did in fact hold two races but they were non-championship. If Uniontown did pay for championship level racing but was not credited for them, lawsuits would have surely been filed but no such record exists.

The two Uniontown events are as follows:

See also
1920 Indianapolis 500

References
 
 
 
 http://media.indycar.com/pdf/2011/IICS_2011_Historical_Record_Book_INT6.pdf  (p. 77)

AAA Championship Car season
AAA Championship Car
1920 in American motorsport